When You Comin' Back, Red Ryder? is a 1979 American drama film written by Mark Medoff and adapted from his play of the same name. It was directed by Milton Katselas.

Plot
Teddy, a troubled Vietnam veteran, has his car break down near a Texas roadside diner. He goes inside  and subjects the diners to physical and mental torture.

Cast
 Marjoe Gortner as Teddy
 Hal Linden as Richard
 Lee Grant as Clarisse
 Peter Firth as Red
 Candy Clark as Cheryl
 Pat Hingle as Striker
 Stephanie Faracy as Angel
 Bill McKinney as Tommy Clark
 Audra Lindley as Ceil Ryder
 Riley Hill as Junior Ferguson
 Ron Soble as Sheriff Garcia
 Robert Easton as Customs Man
 Barry Cahill as Customs Doctor
 Mark Medoff as Faith Healer
 Alberto Piña as Mexican Father
 Anne Ramsey as Rhea

References

External links 
 
 

1979 films
1979 drama films
American drama films
Columbia Pictures films
Films scored by Jack Nitzsche
American films based on plays
Films set in restaurants
Films set in Texas
Films shot in Texas
Films about hostage takings
1970s English-language films
Films directed by Milton Katselas
1970s American films